This is a list of curling clubs in Sweden. They are organized by the Swedish Curling Association.

Bodens CD - Boden
Borlänge CC - Borlänge
Borås CK - Borås
Djursholms CK - Djursholm
Falun CC - Falun
Göinge CK - Broby
CK Granit-Gävle - Gävle
Göteborgs CK - Gothenburg
Halmstad CK - Halmstad
Hammarstrands CK - Hammarstrand 
Hede CK - Hede
Helsingborgs CK - Helsingborg
Härnösand CK - Härnösand
Järpens CK - Järpen
Jönköping CC - Jönköping
Karlshamns CK - Karlshamn
Carlskrona CC - Karlskrona
Karlstads CK - Karlstad
Kristinehamns CC - Kristinehamn
Curla CK - Landskrona
Leksands CK - Leksand
Lindesbergs CK - Lindesberg
Linköpings CK - Linköping
Lits CC - Lit
Ljusdal CK - Ljusdal
Luleå CK - Luleå
Malmö CK - Malmö
Malung CC - Malung
Mariestads CC - Mariestad
Mjölby AI Curlingförening - Mjölby
Norrköpings CK - Norrköping
Nyköpings CK - Nyköping
Nässjö CK - Nässjö
Oskarshamns CC - Oskarshamn
CK Silverstenen - Sala
Skellefteå CK - Skellefteå
Sollefteå CK - Sollefteå
Sundbybergs Curlinghall - Sundbyberg
Danderyds Curlinghall - Danderyd
Djursholms CK - Stockholm
Stocksunds CK - Stockholm
Sundybergs CK - Stockholm 
Stallmästaregårdens CK - Stockholm
Haga-Mariebergs CK - Stockholm
Amatörföreningens CK - Stockholm
Old Plaers CC - Sundsvall
Sundsvalls CK - Sundsvall
CK Skvadern - Sundsvall
CK Wirgo - Strömsund
Svegs CK - Sveg
Södertälje CK - Södertälje
Umeå CK - Umeå
IK Fyris Curling - Uppsala
Uppsala Curlinggille - Uppsala
Bohuslänska CK - Uddevalla
CK Vänersborg - Vänersborg
Växjö CC - Växjö
Åre CK - Åre
Örebro CS - Örebro
Örnsköldsviks CK - Örnsköldsvik
Östersunds CK - Östersund

References
 
  (web archive; 2016)

Sweden
Curling in Sweden
Curling